Kuyulu can refer to:

 Kuyulu, Aydın
 Kuyulu, Elâzığ